Sakib Viteškić (born December 27, 1952) is a Bosnian former footballer.

References

External links
Profile in French

1952 births
Living people
Footballers from Sarajevo
Bosniaks of Bosnia and Herzegovina
Association football midfielders
Bosnia and Herzegovina footballers
Yugoslav footballers
FK Sarajevo players
MVV Maastricht players
Washington Diplomats (NASL) players
FK Jedinstvo Brčko players
Yugoslav First League players
Eerste Divisie players
North American Soccer League (1968–1984) players
Yugoslav expatriate footballers
Expatriate footballers in the Netherlands
Yugoslav expatriate sportspeople in the Netherlands
Expatriate soccer players in the United States
Yugoslav expatriate sportspeople in the United States